Cadarrius Pride better known as Superstar Pride is an American rapper and songwriter.  His single, "Painting Pictures", reached number 99 in the Billboard hot 100 charts.

Career 
He have interest in music since at a young age and grew up  rapping while he was in college. He later rose to stardom after he released his hit single Painting Pictures which went viral on tiktok.

References

Notes 

His song was taken down by major platforms due to copyright sample but later the issue was resolved.

Citations 

Male rappers
Living people
Rappers from Mississippi
2002 births